A suspended roller coaster is a type of steel roller coaster in which the car hangs from the bottom of the rolling stock by a pivoting fulcrum or hinge assembly. This allows the car and riders to swing side to side as the train races along the track. Due to the swing designs, these roller coasters cannot invert riders.

History 
One of the earliest suspended roller coasters was known as Bisby's Spiral Airship, built in Long Beach, California in the early 1900s. Riders on Bisby's Spiral Airship rode in square gondolas suspended from the track above, which were then carried via lift hill to the top of a tower. The gondolas then rolled down the track, which spiraled down the tower back to the loading platform. The attraction operated at least until the mid 1910s.

In 1975, German aircraft manufacturer Messerschmitt debuted Alpenflug at the annual Oktoberfest fair in Munich, Germany. Featuring multi-car trains and a 2700-foot twisting, spiraling layout, Alpenflug was a hit during the 16-day fair. However, the design was scrapped after analysis revealed significant stress in the track, whose curves were not banked, and in the wheel assemblies, as the train's brake fins were located at the bottom of the train's gondolas instead of near the track itself.

The first permanent modern suspended roller coaster was The Bat at Kings Island. Built by Arrow Development, The Bat opened April 21, 1981, but it was soon plagued with problems. The problems included: excessive stress on the support springs due to the unbanked curved track sections and stress on the wheels because the brakes were mounted at bottom of the swinging cars. Kings Island's US$3.8 million ride closed in 1983 and was later scheduled for demolition. The Bat's former site was occupied by the Arrow designed looping coaster Vortex until its demolition in 2019.  The suspended coaster would return to Kings Island in 1993 with the addition of Top Gun, which. after a period of being called Flight Deck, was renamed The Bat in 2014, a reference to the original 1981 coaster.

Arrow-Huss refined its suspended roller coaster designs, culminating in the debut of The Big Bad Wolf at Busch Gardens Williamsburg and XLR-8 at Six Flags Astroworld in 1984. After 1984, as Arrow Dynamics, they manufactured ten suspended roller coasters, including Iron Dragon at Cedar Point, Ninja at Six Flags Magic Mountain, Vampire at Chessington World of Adventures, and Vortex at Canada's Wonderland.

Other manufacturers have also constructed their variations on the suspended roller coaster. Before contacting Arrow-Huss for The Big Bad Wolf, Busch Gardens contacted Anton Schwarzkopf to design a suspended coaster, dubbed the "Flugbahn". However, Schwarzkopf went bankrupt, completing only a model and the footers of the actual coaster. Dutch designer Vekoma manufactured a suspended model dubbed "Swinging Turns," of which three copies were constructed. Vekoma offers both Arrow-style traditional car designs as well as floorless cars where the riders' feet dangle, similar to Vekoma's inverted coasters but the cars are able to swing. In 2001, Vampire at Chessington World of Adventures was modified to use Vekoma's floorless trains. Caripro, another designer based in The Netherlands, manufactured twelve suspended roller coasters and American designer Setpoint manufactured four.

Installations 

* Operates with Vekoma trains
** Never operated

See also 
 Suspension railway, a similar design used in public transport applications

References

External links 

Setpoint's Official Website
Vekoma's Official Website

 
Types of roller coaster